Naan Than Bala is a 2014 Tamil-language drama film directed by Kannan and produced by J. A. Lawrence under SSS Entertainments. Vivek plays the film's lead role. The film released on 13 June 2014.

Plot
Bala (Vivek), a poor priest, lives in an agraharam in Kumbakonam, looking after his aged parents and performing puja at a Perumal temple. Circumstances force him to accept help from a hired killer named Poochi (Venkatraj J) to save his father from a jail sentence. Life takes an unfortunate turn for Bala. Unable to bear the taunts of the neighbours, Bala's parents commit suicide. Bala is forced to leave the agraharam. He begins a new life with Poochi in Kancheepuram. Vaishali (Shwetha Bandekar), a young Saurashtrian who sells poli on the streets, comes into Bala's life. Soon they get engaged. Meanwhile, a close friendship develops between Bala and Poochi. Bala learns of Poochi's true identity. The police are desperate to hunt down Poochi. Bala is a good influence on Poochi, and he reforms a cold-hearted killer. The second half is all about whether their friendship survives this war of principles.

Cast

 Vivek as Bala
 Venkatraj J as Poochi
 Shwetha Bandekar as Vaishali
 Cell Murugan as Thomas Alva Edison
 Thennavan as Kattooran
 Lavanya
 Sujatha Sivakumar
 Mayilsamy
 Master Rahul
 Baby Pisha
 Ashok Pandiyan
 Ravi Ganesh as Auto Driver
 Arulmani Seenivasan
 Dhruva
 Sounder
 Meenakshi Ammal
 Kanchipuram Abdulla
 Ragu 
 Niresh
 Afsal
 Jai Rajeev

Production
Kannan had approached Vivek with the script and the team began preliminary work in June 2013.  In November 2013, Vivek confirmed filming had started and stated he would portray the role of a Hindu priest at a Perumal temple in Kumbakonam, who gets into a relationship with a local thug. He said that he opted to move away from his usual comedy roles after being advised by director Bala and Kamal Haasan.  During production, the media wrongly reported that R. Kannan who had made Settai (2013) was director of the film. He later clarified it was not him but R. Kannan.

The team held a large scale audio launch event in December 2013 at Kamala Theatre, Chennai with  Mani Ratnam, Bharathiraja, K. Balachander and A. R. Rahman in attendance as chief guests. Vivek was insistent that Rahman attended the event and pushed back the launch by a week and changed the setting from Sathyam Cinemas, in order to accommodate the composer.

Music

Release
The satellite rights of the film were sold to Jaya TV.

Reception
Baradwaj Rangan wrote, "Naan Than Bala should have been shattering drama. That it isn't is a function of the usual problems of our cinema — sketchy performances in the supporting parts, flavourless romance, comedy that constantly undermines the film's seriousness, lazy contrivances, mood-killing songs and an over-the-top ending". The Times of India gave the film 2 stars out of 5 and wrote, "There is juicy melodrama in-built in the story of Naan Than Bala but the writing and direction are plain amateurish. The trouble is that the director, Kannan, never really has a grip on this material...Kannan's treatment of this material is at best TV serial melodrama". IANS gave 2.5 stars out of 5 and wrote, "Shoddy writing and direction makes Naan Than Bala a boring film despite good intention". The New Indian Express wrote, "The plot did have the potential to turn into an intriguing play-out of human inadequacies and emotions. But the director fails to capitalise on it". Silverscreen.in wrote, "There is nothing wrong with the premise in itself : a simple tale of amity between a Hindu priest and a hardened criminal, but there is a lot wrong with the execution". Behindwoods gave it 1.75 stars out of 5 and wrote, "Naan Than Bala is an old tale of Dharma's triumph over evil that doesn't engage you well enough and is kind of preachy at places, but with a very heartfelt performance from Vivek". Indiaglitz.com also gave 1.75 out of 5 and wrote, "Debutante director R.Kannan's intentions are noble. But what hampers the overall impact is the script replete with cliches and uninteresting narration. The glitches in writing and execution are too many to let us hope that a good message and Vivekh's acting prowess can help the film sail through".

Box office
The film collected  in Chennai in first weekend.

See also
 Vivek

References

External links
 

2014 films
2014 drama films
Indian drama films
2010s Tamil-language films